Hayri Sevimli (born 22 February 1991) is a German former professional footballer who plays as a midfielder.

Career
Sevimli made his professional debut for Carl Zeiss Jena in the 3. Liga on 2 October 2010, coming on as a substitute in the 68th minute for Josip Landeka in a 3–1 home loss against Hansa Rostock.

Personal life
Sevimli was accused of attacking and injuring a ticket inspector in Jena with a glass bottle on 14 November 2010 together with fellow Carl Zeiss Jena youth player Ömer Cay. The Jena public prosecutor's office were investigating the situation involving Cay and Sevimli. Following the incident, Carl Zeiss Jena temporarily suspended Sevimli from play and training operations.

References

External links
 
 
 
 Carl Zeiss Jena II statistics at Fussball.de

1991 births
Living people
Footballers from Bremen
German footballers
Association football midfielders
VfB Oldenburg players
VfL Osnabrück players
FC Carl Zeiss Jena players
3. Liga players